Lynn County is a county in the U.S. state of Texas. As of the 2020 census, its population was 5,596. Its county seat is Tahoka. The county was created in 1876 and organized in 1903.

Lynn County, along with Crosby and Lubbock Counties, is part of the Lubbock Metropolitan Statistical Area (MSA). The Lubbock MSA and Levelland Micropolitan Statistical Area (µSA), encompassing only Hockley County, form the larger Lubbock–Levelland Combined Statistical Area (CSA).

Lynn County was one of 30 prohibition, or entirely dry, counties in Texas, but is now a moist county.

The county has two historical museums, the O'Donnell Heritage Museum, with a Dan Blocker room in O'Donnell, and the Tahoka Pioneer Museum in Tahoka.

The county is also home to the Lynn County Hospital District that provides medical care to the county and surrounding area

History

Native Americans

Apache and Comanche peoples roamed the high plains until various military expeditions of the 19th century pushed them away.

The Red River War of 1874 was a military campaign to drive out the Apaches, Comanches, and Kiowas in Texas. In 1877, the ill-fated Nolan Expedition crossed the county in search of livestock stolen by Comanche renegades.
The various Indian tribes had moved on by the time of white settlement due to the depletion of the buffalo herds by hunters.

Settlers

In the early 1880s, sheep and cattle ranchers began to set up operations in the county. The situation changed as large-scale ranching spread into the county.

W C. Young of Fort Worth and Illinois Irishman Ben Galbraith established the beginnings of the Curry Comb Ranch in the northwest part of Garza County. By 1880, it spilled over into Lynn County. The Square Compass Ranch of Garza County also protruded into Lynn County.

The county remained sparsely settled ranching territory for two decades after 1880. It had no towns; the population was nine in 1880, 24 in 1890, and 17 in 1900. Farmers began to move into the county and invest in corn, grains, and cotton.

County established

Lynn County was formed in 1876 from Bexar. The county was organized in 1903, with Tahoka becoming the county seat.

New towns were founded during the early years of the 20th century. O'Donnell, named for railroad man Tom J. O'Donnell, was established in 1910 as a speculative venture based on the opening up of new farmlands in southern Lynn and northern Dawson Counties. Wilson, 13 miles (19 km) northeast of Tahoka, was established in 1912 to attract farmers to the newly opened lands of the Dixie Ranch. A large number of Central Texas Germans purchased county lands, thus beginning a small-scale migration of Germans into the county that lasted into the 1950s.

Cotton farming prospered in the early part of the 20th century. Farmers later expanded to wheat and sorghum, plus cattle, sheep, hogs, and poultry, chiefly chickens and turkeys.

Oil was discovered in the county in 1950.

Geography

Geographic features
 Caprock Escarpment, eastern edge of Lynn County
 Double Mountain Fork Brazos River, begins as a small depression between Draw, Redwine, and Grassland, Texas.
 Double Lakes, northwest of Tahoka
 Guthrie Lake, southwest of Tahoka
 Tahoka Lake, northeast of Tahoka

Major highways
  U.S. Highway 84
  U.S. Highway 87
  U.S. Highway 380

Adjacent counties
 Lubbock County (north)
 Garza County (east)
 Borden County (southeast)
 Dawson County (south)
 Terry County (west)
 Hockley County (northwest)

Demographics

Note: the US Census treats Hispanic/Latino as an ethnic category. This table excludes Latinos from the racial categories and assigns them to a separate category. Hispanics/Latinos can be of any race.

As of the census of 2000, 6,550 people, 2,354 households, and 1,777 families resided in the county. The population density was 7 people per square mile (3/km2). The 2,671 housing units averaged 3 per square mile (1/km2). The county's racial makeup was 75.53% White, 2.84% Black or African American, 1.02% Native American, 0.15% Asian, 18.24% from other races, and 2.21% from two or more races. About 44% of the population was Hispanic or Latino of any race.

Of the 2,354 households, 38.90% had children under the age of 18 living with them, 61.00% were married couples living together, 11.10% had a female householder with no husband present, and 24.50% were not families; 23.10% of all households were made up of individuals, and 12.10% had someone living alone who was 65 years of age or older. The average household size was 2.76 and the average family size was 3.25.

In the county, the population was distributed as 31.20% under the age of 18, 7.80% from 18 to 24, 26.00% from 25 to 44, 21.00% from 45 to 64, and 14.00% who were 65 years of age or older. The median age was 35 years. For every 100 females, there were 99.60 males.  For every 100 females age 18 and over, there were 93.80 males.

The median income for a household in the county was $26,694, and for a family was $33,146. Males had a median income of $27,972 versus $19,531 for females. The per capita income for the county was $14,090. About 19.30% of families and 22.60% of the population were below the poverty line, including 28.00% of those under age 18 and 24.40% of those age 65 or over.

The county is served by a weekly newspaper, nearby stations KBXJ (FM) and KPET (AM), and the various Lubbock radio and TV stations. KAMZ (FM) and KMMX (FM) are licensed to Tahoka, but have offices and studios in Lubbock and originate few if any programs from Lynn County.

Communities

Cities
 New Home
 O'Donnell (small part in Dawson County)
 Tahoka (county seat)
 Wilson

Unincorporated communities
 Grassland
 Wayside

Notable residents
 Dan Blocker, actor
 Jerry "Bo" Coleman, radio disc jockey
 Phil Hardberger, politician
 E L Short, former member of both houses of the Texas State Legislature

Politics

Education
School districts serving the county include:
 Dawson Independent School District
 New Home Independent School District
 O'Donnell Independent School District
 Post Independent School District
 Slaton Independent School District
 Southland Independent School District
 Tahoka Independent School District
 Wilson Independent School District

The county is in the service area of South Plains College.

See also

 National Register of Historic Places listings in Lynn County, Texas
 Recorded Texas Historic Landmarks in Lynn County

References

External links

 Lynn County government’s website
 
 Lynn County Profile from the Texas Association of Counties
 Roadside America, Dan Blocker Memorial

 
1876 establishments in Texas
Populated places established in 1876